Secret Sunshine is a 2007 South Korean drama film directed by Lee Chang-dong. The screenplay based on the short fiction "The Story of a Bug" by Lee Cheong-jun that focuses on a woman as she wrestles with the questions of grief, madness and faith. The Korean title Miryang (or Milyang) is named after the city that served as the film's setting and filming location, of which "Secret Sunshine" is the literal translation. For her performance in the film, Jeon Do-yeon won the Prix d'interprétation féminine (Best Actress) at the 2007 Cannes Film Festival. The film also won the award for Best Film at the Asian Film Awards and at the Asia Pacific Screen Awards. The film sold 1,710,364 tickets nationwide in South Korea alone.

Plot 
After the death of her husband from a traffic accident, Lee Shin-ae (Jeon Do-yeon) and her only child Jun move to Miryang, South Gyeongsang Province, her husband's hometown, to start life anew. While entering Miryang, Shin-ae's car breaks down. The local mechanic in Miryang Kim Jong-chan (Song Kang-ho) fixes her car and assists Shin-ae as she opens her piano school and attempts to purchase land to build a house on. Jong-chan claims he is only trying to be a Good Samaritan.

One afternoon, Shin-ae meets a middle-school girl (referred to as "the girl" from now onwards), whose father is Jun's daycare teacher. Just outside her home, Shin-ae is called by a pharmacist who tells her that the solution to her problems is belief in God. Shin-ae is skeptical, but nevertheless takes the pharmacist's scripture. At home, Shin-ae and Jun engage in a prank where Shin-ae pretends to be unable to find Jun.

Shin-ae's brother visits from Seoul, wondering why she has returned to Miryang considering that her husband cheated on her. Shin-ae denies this, but still hates her late husband for unspecified reasons. Before leaving, Shin-ae's brother tells Jong-chan to stop pursuing Shin-ae.

One night, Shin-ae returns home late after partying to discover that Jun is missing. She receives a phone call (implied to be from Jun's kidnapper) and draws all of the money from her bank account to pay as ransom. Appalled at the pitiful amount of money she paid, Shin-ae reveals that her claim to buying land was a lie to appear rich; she really had no more money.

Returning home, Shin-ae discovers the girl peering into her residence; the latter refuses to explain why and escapes. Later, police officers arrive to take her to a reservoir, where Jun was drowned. The kidnapper is swiftly captured, but Shin-ae doesn't seem to be vengeful and sheds no tears at Jun's funeral.

Feeling unwell one day, Shin-ae visits the pharmacist, who convinces her to join their faith, even though Shin-ae doesn't understand why God would let an innocent child like Jun die. Followed around by Jong-chan, Shin-ae soon becomes a believer and claims to have found inner peace; even Jong-chan starts going to church.

At home one day, Shin-ae hears noises in her bathroom and opens the door, crying out Jun's name, but the bathroom user is a little boy from Jun's daycare. Dropping off the other daycare children, Shin-ae witnesses the girl being bullied but doesn't intervene.

Her church friends throw her a birthday party, during which she states that she will visit the kidnapper, now in prison, to forgive him. Jong-chan doesn't understand why Shin-ae needs to visit him to forgive him, but nevertheless accompanies her. Surprisingly, the kidnapper (turning out to be Jun's daycare teacher) reveals that he found God as well and that God has absolved him of his sins. Shin-ae doesn't understand how God can absolve him of his sins before she has forgiven him and felt true peace.

One day, Shin-ae steals a CD of a song called "Lies" from a store and blasts it on a loudspeaker where a group has gathered to thank God. Later that night, she receives a phone call, which she claims to Jong-chan to have been from the kidnapper; he dismisses the idea but tells her to calm down and arranges a dinner date for the next day. However, Shin-ae walks into the pharmacy and seduces the pharmacist's husband, but he is unable to perform, and she misses the date. Jong-chan rejects her proposal for sex and offers to drive her home, but she physically refuses. On the way home, she passes by a vigil held for her by the pharmacist couple; it is interrupted when a rock is hurled at a window. At home, Shin-ae slashes her wrists.

On the day she is discharged from the hospital, Jong-chan takes her to a salon, where the girl now works, to do her hair. She reveals that she went into juvenile detention for falling in with the wrong crowd and quit school. In the middle of her cut, Shin-ae leaves the salon. At home, she begins cutting her own hair. Jong-chan arrives, offering to hold up a mirror for her.

Cast 
Jeon Do-yeon as Lee Shin-ae
Song Kang-ho as Kim Jong-chan
Jo Young-jin as Park Do-seop
Kim Young-jae as Lee Min-ki
Song Mi-rim as Jeong-ah
Seon Jeong-yeop
Kim Mi-hyang
Lee Yoon-hee
Kim Jong-su
Kim Mi-kyung
Lee Joong-ok as Hope House employee	
Yeom Hye-ran

Critical response 
The film was widely acclaimed on the festival circuit, with particular and universal praise for Do-yeon's performance. It received multiple awards, including several Best Film wins and numerous Best Actress awards for Do-yeon. It was nominated for the Palme d'Or at the 2007 Cannes Film Festival, but did not win.

The film was similarly acclaimed in its American release in 2010. On Rotten Tomatoes, the film has an approval rating of 94% based on 31 reviews, with an average rating of 7.68/10. The site's critical consensus reads, "Plumbing the depths of tragedy without succumbing to melodrama, Chang-dong Lee's Secret Sunshine is a grueling, albeit moving, piece of beautifully acted cinema." With 6 reviews, it scored 84 on Metacritic, indicating "universal acclaim." A.O. Scott of the New York Times called the film "clear, elegant and lyrical. The experience of watching [Chang-dong's] films is not always pleasant... yet his quiet and exacting humaneness infuses even the most dreadful moments with an intimation of grace." Noel Murray, writing for the A.V. Club, called it "a frequently beautiful film with a cold, dark heart" and praised Do-yeon's "powerful performance." Michael Atkinson of the Village Voice wrote that "the red-eyed Jeon, landing a Best Actress at Cannes in 2007 and unforgettable as well in The Housemaid, goes to hell and back." In 2019, director Hirokazu Kore-eda named it as the best film of the 21st century, praising Lee's "deep insight into human nature".  In 2020, The Guardian ranked it number 7 among the classics of modern South Korean Cinema.

Home video release 
On August 23, 2011, The Criterion Collection released the film on DVD and Blu-ray, both of which includes a new video interview with Lee Chang-dong, a behind-the-scenes featurette, the US theatrical trailer, and a booklet featuring a new film essay by film critic Dennis Lim.

Accolades

See also 
Miryang

References

External links 

Secret Sunshine: A Cinema of Lucidity an essay by Dennis Lim at the Criterion Collection

2007 films
2007 drama films
South Korean drama films
Films about evangelicalism
Films based on short fiction
Films directed by Lee Chang-dong
Films set in South Gyeongsang Province
Films set in Seoul
2000s Korean-language films
Asian Film Award for Best Film winners
Films about child abduction
Films shot in South Gyeongsang Province
2000s South Korean films
CJ Entertainment films
Cinema Service films